Grenada–Libya relations were formal diplomatic relations between the People's Revolutionary Government of Grenada and the State of Libya between 1979 and November 1983. They were resumed in 1998.

History of relations
During the United States invasion of Grenada, Libya had 3 or 4 troops present.

In 1982, at the time, Mr Bishop wrote a letter to the Libyan leader, Colonel Muammar Gaddafi, if it possible to borrowed six million US dollar as a soft loan to complete the runway at Point Salines International Airport, to which Gaddafi agreed to, (today known as, Maurice Bishop International Airport).

References

External links

Libya
Bilateral relations of Libya